Yomo & Maulkie were an American hardcore hip hop duo from Los Angeles, California, composed of rappers Yomo (born Yomo Smith) and Maulkie (born Mark Eric Green). They were signed with Ruthless Records, the label owned by Eazy-E. Their discography consists of one studio album, which spawned three singles.

The duo first worked with Eazy-E in 1989 when they provided additional vocals to The D.O.C.'s debut album No One Can Do It Better. They were associated with the members of N.W.A., although the duo was not a gangsta group. Instead, its lyrics hewed more toward Public Enemy's political style. In 1991, Eazy worked with them again as executive producer for their only full-length album Are U Xperienced?, which was distributed by Atco/Atlantic Records. The album's name is derived from Jimi Hendrix's 1967 album Are You Experienced?. The group found little commercial success with their single "Glory" from the album, which peaked at number 7 on the Hot Rap Songs. The song "For the Love of Money" off of the album was reused on the Bone Thugs-n-Harmony single "Foe tha Love of $" from the 1994 album Creepin on ah Come Up. Maulkie later joined Ice Cube's protégé group Da Lench Mob on their sophomore effort Planet of da Apes.

Discography
Studio album
1991: Are U Xperienced?
Singles
 "Mama Don't" (1991)
 "Mockingbird" (1991)
 "Glory" / "Are U Xperienced" (1991)

References

Hip hop duos
Atco Records artists
American musical duos
Hip hop groups from California
Ruthless Records artists
African-American musical groups
Musical groups from Los Angeles
1989 establishments in California
Musical groups established in 1989
Musical groups disestablished in 1992